Shah Jahan Mosque may refer to:

 Shah Jahan Mosque, Thatta, Pakistan
 Shah Jahan Mosque, Woking, England

Mosque disambiguation pages